Hexapradol (INN) is a psychostimulant drug which was never marketed.

It also had cytoprotective/antiulcer properties.

Synthesis
Synthesis methods are described.

See also 
 β-Phenylmethamphetamine
 3,3-Diphenylcyclobutanamine
 Phenylpropanolamine
 Pipradol

References 

Tertiary alcohols
Amines
Phenylethanolamines
Stimulants
Abandoned drugs